Shorea monticola is a tree in the family Dipterocarpaceae, native to Borneo. The specific epithet monticola means "mountain-dwelling", referring to the habitat.

Description
The bark becomes cracked and flaky.

Distribution and habitat
Shorea monticola is endemic to Borneo.

References

monticola
Endemic flora of Borneo
Plants described in 1962